Sofia Fiore may refer to:

Sofia Fiore, character in Princess Protection Programme
Sofia Fiore, character in Inheritance (2020 film)